Parkeston may refer to:

 Parkeston, Essex
 Parkeston, Western Australia